Beilun River, or Ka Long River, Bắc Luân River is a river of Guangxi Zhuang Autonomous Region in southwest China and Quảng Ninh Province in northeast Vietnam. It runs roughly along the last stretch of the land border of the China-Vietnam border.

Rivers of Guangxi
Rivers of Quảng Ninh province
International rivers of Asia
China–Vietnam border
Rivers of Vietnam